The 1801 Delaware gubernatorial election was held on October 6, 1801.

Acting Governor James Sykes was not eligible for re-election under the Delaware Constitution of 1792. 

Democratic-Republican nominee David Hall defeated Federalist nominee Nathaniel Mitchell with 50.13% of the vote.

General election

Results

References

Bibliography
 
 
 

1801
Delaware
Gubernatorial